Kēśirāja, also spelled Keshiraja, was a 13th-century Kannada grammarian, poet and writer. He is particularly known for authoring Shabdamanidarpana, an authoritative work on Kannada grammar. According to Dravidian scholar Sheldon Pollock, because of this work he is considered the "greatest theorist of Kannada grammar". He was also a scholar in Sanskrit as well and a court poet (Aasthaana kavi) in the Hoysala Court.

Early life
Kesiraja was born in a literary family, comprising several well-known Kannada writers. His father, Mallikarjuna (C. 1245 CE), was a Kannada poet and brother-in-law of the epic writer Janna. Kesiraja was also the grandson on his mother's side of another noted poet, Śankara (Sumanōbana), who was priest of the Yadava capital and poet laureate to Hoysala King Narasimha I. In some of his works, Kesiraja has referred to himself as Kesava.

Shabdamanidarpana

Shabdamanidarpana, ("Jewel-mirror of Grammar") was authored by Kesiraja in 1260 CE. This work remains a comprehensive, authoritative work on Kannada grammar. The rules mentioned therein were penned in kanda metre and followed a vrutti style (illustrative commentary by the author himself). Though Kesiraja followed the model of Sanskrit grammar of the Katantra school, and that of earlier writings on Kannada grammar, his work has an originality of its own.

The text of Shabdamanidarpana begins with poetry ehalting earlier generations of writer who are cited by Kesiraja as authoritative examples:

An attempt at vocabulary building is provided in several parts of the work. There is a list of verbal roots and words containing ḷ and ḹ sounds. There is also a chapter called "PrayŌgasāra" where Kesiraja has quoted a number of rare words along with their meanings.

Passion for grammar
Kesiraja had a passion for grammar, which is evident from his writings through his work Shabdamanidarpana.

Literary works
Apart from his extant grammar Shabdamanidarpana, Kesiraja authored several other writings in Kannada, though they are deemed lost:
 Prabodhachandra (ಪ್ರಬೋಧಚಂದ್ರ)
 Chorapalaka Charitam (ಚೋರಪಾಲಕ ಚರಿತ)
 Kiratam (or Kiratarjuniyam) (ಕಿರಾತ)
 Shubhadraharana (ಸುಭದ್ರಾ ಹರಣ)
 Sri Chitramale (ಶ್ರೀ ಚಿತ್ರಮಾಲೆ)

Notes

References 

Kannada-language writers
Linguists of Kannada
13th-century Indian writers
Sanskrit poets
Indian male writers